Gabriel Tanimu Aduda is a Nigerian civil servant and in 2021 the Permanent Secretary for the Nigerian Federal Ministry of Foreign Affairs. He previously served in the Ministry of Youth and Sports Development and was redeployed to the ministry of Foreign Affairs in December 2020. Before becoming a permanent secretary, he previously served as Director, Economic Research and Policy Management with the Federal Ministry of Finance and Head of Strategy and Reorientation at the Economic and Financial Crimes Commission.

Early life and education
Aduda has a BSc. in Geography and Planning from the University of Jos, a Master’s Degree in Urban & Regional Planning from the University of Ibadan (1998), and a Postgraduate Certificate in Corruption Studies from the University of Hong Kong (2012). He has also attended training courses, for example the "Improving Governance and Economic Development in Africa" at the World Bank Institute in Freetown, Sierra Leone. Gabriel is the younger brother of Senator Philips Tanimu Aduda, who is representing the Federal Capital Territory.

Controversy
In 2017, a report by Sahara Reporters, Premium Times and some media outlets suggested that the Vice President Yemi Osinbajo may have appointed an unqualified person as a permanent secretary. This led to calls for his dismissal from the position. The Coalition For F.C.T Indigenous Groups Association under Kamal Adamu Shaibu criticized these reports, as he claimed the controversial reports published in Premium Times, Sahara Reporters and other media outlets were sponsored by people who fruitlessly fought against the promotion of Gabrial Aduda to the position of a Director in Federal Civil Service.

References 

Nigerian civil servants
Ambassadors of Nigeria
Living people
1971 births
University of Ibadan alumni